Koromo may refer to:

Koromo, a variety of koi
Koromo, Mali
Koromo, a former name of Toyota, Aichi
Japanese word for clothing
Koromo Amae, the name of a character from the Japanese manga/anime Saki.